Chenesht (also Romanized as Chinisht; also known as Chenīsht Çenect) is a village in Naharjan Rural District, Mud District, Sarbisheh County, South Khorasan Province, Iran. At the 2006 census, its population was 1,009, in 286 families.

References 

Populated places in Sarbisheh County